Advaitic Songs is the fifth studio album by American heavy metal band Om, released on July 24, 2012. The album has received a generally favorable response from both fans and critics, though its reception was more mixed than past works. The album has a 67 on Metacritic, indicating "generally favorable reviews". As with Pilgrimage and God Is Good, Advaitic Songs album cover again visits Iconography from Christianity. The cover of the album features an image of John the Baptist.

Track listing

Versions 
Advaitic Songs was released on CD and, for the first time in OM's vinyl-issuing history, a deluxe 2x vinyl audiophile version pressed at 45rpm. In 2013, a cassette version was released, as was a cassette version of the band's 2009 album God Is Good.

Personnel 
Om
Al Cisneros – bass, vocals, piano, percussion
Emil Amos – drums, guitar, piano, percussion

Guest musicians
Robert Aiki Aubrey Lowe – additional vocals, tambura on "Gethsemane" and "Sinai"
Jackie Perez Gratz – cello
Jory Fankuchen – violin
Kate Ramsey – vocals on "Addis"
Lucas Chen – additional cello on "Addis"
Lorraine Rath – flute on "Haqq al-Yaqin"
Hom Nath Upadhyaya – tabla on "Haqq al-Yaqin"

References

External links 
 Official website
 Facebook official
 Drag City – Advaitic Songs

Om (band) albums
2012 albums